Arisce Wanzer is a model, comedian, and actress.

Early life
Wanzer was born in Woodbridge, Virginia. At age 14, seeing a Victoria's Secret Fashion Show inspired her to pursue fashion and modeling. She moved to Miami, which she describes as a "trans Mecca," to attend the Art Institute of Miami at age 17 or 18. It was there, at gay clubs, that she learned what transgender was when strangers would ask her when she planned on transitioning. She then realized she was trans. At age 19, she came out to her mother, who was very accepting and supportive. She lived in Miami for five years before moving to New York City.

Career
Wanzer participated in a drag troupe for three to four years, also participating in numerous shows at Miami Fashion Week. Subsequently, Wanzer did catwalks at New York Fashion Week and Los Angeles Fashion Week.

Wanzer has been the covergirl for the Spiegel catalog (the first trans model to do so), and has appeared in Elle, Vogue, Vogue Italia, Forbes, and Purple, and worked with high-profile photographers such as Patrick Demarchelier. She has modeled for TopShop and Opening Ceremony. She appears in Strut on Oxygen and the trans-focused comedic webseries Fish Tank, alongside Isis King. She is also featured as part of AT&T's Live Proud campaign. In June 2019, she walked the red carpet at L.A. Pride and was interviewed by associate producer of Amazon's Pride: The Series, Braden Bradley. In 2020, she appeared in the premiere episode of Dr. 90210 that shared her rhinoplasty surgery and jaw reshaping with Dr. Michelle Lee.

Filmography

Other

Podcasts

References

External links

Transgender female models
Transgender models
American models
LGBT people from Virginia
Year of birth missing (living people)
Living people
21st-century American LGBT people